Platyptilia benitensis is a moth of the family Pterophoridae. It is known from Equatorial Guinea.

The larvae feed on Uncaria rhynchophylla.

References

benitensis
Endemic fauna of Equatorial Guinea
Moths of Africa
Moths described in 1913